Alexei Nikolayevich Beketov (3 March 1862, Kharkov, Russian Empire — 23 November 1941, Kharkov, Ukrainian SSR) was a Russian Imperial and later a Soviet architect, in the Classical style. He was an honorary Professor at the St. Petersburg Imperial Academy of Arts from 1894.

Biography 
Beketov was of Russian ancestry; on his father's side he came from a Russian noble family with roots from the Penza Governorate. His mother Elena Beketova was born in St. Petersburg. Alexei Beketov was the son of Nikolay Beketov, a noted Professor of chemistry at the Imperial University of Kharkov. He studied at the local realschule and a private art school, operated by Maria Raevskaia-Ivanova.

During that same period, he worked with Maximilian Messmacher on several projects, including the palace of Grand Duke Michael Mikhailovich. In 1894, he was awarded the title of "Academician" for his work on what is now known as the Kharkiv Korolenko State Scientific Library.

He designed over one hundred buildings throughout the region, including approximately forty in Kharkhiv. Several large projects, including an opera house, were never realized due to World War I and the Russian Civil War. In addition to his architectural designs, he was an amateur artist. Many of his landscape paintings are in private collections. Alexey Dushkin, and Vasyl Krychevsky are some of his best-known students. He was married to Anna Alchevska (1868-1931), daughter of the industrialist, Aleksey Alchevsky and his wife, Khrystyna, an advocate for national education.

He died in 1941, during the German occupation, aged seventy-nine. Streets in Kharkiv and Salavat have been named after him. In 1995, a new subway station on the Kharkiv Metro was named the Arkhitektora Beketova. His dacha in Alushta is now a museum.

Selected buildings

References

Further reading 
 "The 145th Anniversary of the Birth of A. N. Beketov" by Darya Dudushkina @  Архитектурный вестник (The Architectural Bulletin), 2007
 Detailed biography by L. Rozvadovskaya @ URA-Inform
 Biography by D. Petrenko @  Вечерний Харьков
 Biography and photographs by N. Khorobrykh @ Our Kharkhiv

External links

 "Архитектор Бекетов", a brief biography and list of buildings @ the Kharkiv website
 "ДОМ-МУЗЕЙ АКАДЕМИКА АРХИТЕКТУРЫ А. Н. БЕКЕТОВА" (The Beketov Museum) @ the Alushta website
 Monument to Beketov© at the University of Construction and Architecture

1862 births
1941 deaths
Ukrainian architects
Soviet architects
Imperial Academy of Arts alumni
People from Kharkiv